Adolphus W. Umstead House is a historic home located at Bahama, Durham County, North Carolina.  It was built about 1850, and is a two-story, three bay, Greek Revival style frame I-house. It has a long one-story offset rear ell and a one-story one-room side wing.  Also on the property is a contributing stable.

It was listed on the National Register of Historic Places in 1989.

References

Houses on the National Register of Historic Places in North Carolina
Greek Revival houses in North Carolina
Houses completed in 1850
Houses in Durham County, North Carolina
National Register of Historic Places in Durham County, North Carolina